Molista (before 1928: Μεσαριά - Mesaria) is a settlement in the Ioannina regional unit in Epirus, Greece. It is situated on the northwestern slope of Smolikas, between the villages Monastiri to the southwest and Gannadio to the northeast. It is part of the municipality of Konitsa.  In 2011 its population was 23.  The GR-20 (Ioannina - Konitsa - Kozani), the old road is approximately 5 km west.   The village is almost uninhabited during the winter months.

Population

History
It is unknown when the village was founded. In the area around 3,000 years old lekythoi containing ashes have been found by archeologists. This may indicate that the first inhabitants were Molossians. Others claim that the village was settled later, during the 17th century. Molista was part of the Ottoman Empire until 1913, when it came to Greece.

See also

List of settlements in the Ioannina regional unit

External links
Molista at the GTP Travel Pages
Several information about the village

References

Populated places in Ioannina (regional unit)